NGC 5662 is an open cluster in the constellation Centaurus. It was discovered by Nicolas Louis de Lacaille on May 17, 1752 from South Africa. James Dunlop observed it on July 10, 1826 from Parramatta, Australia and added it to his catalog as No. 342.

It is a rich cluster (Trumpler class II3r), with 295 stars according to Haug (1978) and 280 according with Archinal, Hynes (2003). One of its members, V Centauri, is a cepheid variable. Despite its large distance from the cluster centre, it has high likelihood of being a member of it. 
The tidal radius of the cluster is 6.4 - 12.4 parsecs (21 - 40 light years) and represents the average outer limit of NGC 5662, beyond which a star is unlikely to remain gravitationally bound to the cluster core.

References

External links 

5662
Centaurus (constellation)
Open clusters